In algebraic topology, the homotopy excision theorem offers a substitute for the absence of excision in homotopy theory. More precisely, let  be an excisive triad with  nonempty, and suppose the pair  is -connected, and the pair  is -connected, . Then the map induced by the inclusion ,
,

A geometric proof is given in a book by Tammo tom Dieck.

This result should also be seen as a consequence of the most general form of the Blakers–Massey theorem, which deals with the non-simply-connected case. 

The most important consequence is the Freudenthal suspension theorem.

References

Bibliography 
 J. Peter May, A Concise Course in Algebraic Topology, Chicago University Press.

Theorems in homotopy theory